Hobby Markets Online was an early internet auction company and which ran a series of person-to-person marketplaces for high-end collectibles. With its first auction held on October 15, 1995, it is believed to be the second person-to-person online auction marketplace after eBay. Both of these auction websites were launched in the San Francisco Bay Area although the respective founders did not know about each other or their websites at the time.

Origins
The founders of Hobby Markets Online Jonathan Hubbard and Wendy Dick. Hubbard was a second-year student at Harvard Business School and Dick was multimedia producer who, at that time, was producing some of the earliest electronic storefronts on AOL. Hubbard was a coin collector and was familiar with the pre-internet trading and auction systems.

Hobby Markets was founded in April 1995 as Affinity Traders Online, a collection of online auction websites for different types of collectibles such as coins, stamps, sports memorabilia. The first internet-based auction was started on Numismatists.com, a coin collecting site, on October 15, 1995 and by May 1996 they were selling about $30,000 in coins per week and had record-setting sales by their second anniversary. Hobby Markets later went on to launch three other web sites for Philatelists, Sportstrade, and AuctionVine.

Evolution
In December 1999, Hobby Markets Online merged with BoxLot, Inc. a privately held general person-to-person auction website and platform. In turn BoxLot was acquired by InfoSpace, Inc. in June 2000.

References

Defunct online companies of the United States
Online auction websites of the United States